The Gangulu people, also written Kangulu, Kanolu, Kaangooloo, Ghungalu and other variations, are an Aboriginal Australian people from the Mount Morgan area in Queensland, Australia.

Name
At least one variant name for the Kangulu, Kaangooloo, was formed from the word for "no", ka:ngu.

Language

The Gangulu language is considered to be a dialect of Biri, belonging to the Greater Maric languages.

Country
Gangulu traditional lands occupied an estimated  about the Dawson River as far south as Banana and Theodore. To the northwest, they extended as far as the Mackenzie River and the vicinity of Duaringa and Coomooboolaroo. Their eastern frontier lay towards Biloela, Mount Morgan, Gogango Range, and the upper Don River. Thangool and the headwaters of Grevillea Creek marked its southeastern limits.

People
A correspondent of E. M. Curr, Peter McIntosh, a resident of the area, stated that the Gangulu were a confederation of several groups, the main ones being the Karranbal, the  Maudalgo and the Mulkali. No further data were recorded to enable ethnographer Norman Tindale to clarify the precise nature of the last two groups, but the AUSTLANG database by AIATSIS reports that the Karranbal is the Garaynbal (Garingbal) dialect of Biri and Maudalgo is a variant name of the Wadjigu language and people, a separate group from the Biri, who spoke a Bidjara dialect. Mulkali is not further described.

Along with many other remnants of Queensland tribes who had lost their traditional lands to colonial pastoralists, members of the Kangulu moved to the Cherbourg settlement.

Alternative names
 Ghungalu
 Kaangooloo
 Cangoolootha (tha meant "speech")
 Khangalu, Kangalo, Kongulu, Kongalu
 Kangool-lo, Konguli, Gangulu

Cangoolootha, Gangu, Kangool lo, Kongulu, Khang, Ghangulu, Ka ngool lo

Notes

Citations

Sources

Aboriginal peoples of Queensland